Miss Côte d'Ivoire is a national beauty pageant in Ivory Coast (also known as Cote d'Ivoire).

History
Miss Cote d'Ivoire has existed since 1956 but currently, Miss Cote d'Ivoire new team was placed since 1996. The committee Miss Côte d'Ivoire is an association chaired by Victor Yapobi (Comici). The organizing committee created in 1996 consists of an executive committee of six members and regional committees throughout Côte d'Ivoire. There are even elections were held for the Ivorian out in 2002, 2008, 2009 and 2010 organized by the EU-Comici under the supervision of the Secretary General of the Committee Miss Côte d'Ivoire.

International franchise titles 
Miss Cote d'Ivoire sends delegates to participate in the Big Four international beauty pageants since 1985. Note that the year designates the time Cote d'Ivoire has acquired that particular pageant franchise.

Current franchise

Big Four international beauty pageants:
 Miss World (1985–Present)
 Miss International (1986–Present)

Previous franchise

 Miss Universe (1986)

Titleholders
The winner of Miss Côte d'Ivoire represents her country at the Miss World. On occasion, when the winner does not qualify (due to age) for either contest, a runner-up is sent. — Marie-Françoise Kouamé was competed at Miss Universe 1986 in Panama City, Panama. She was represented CI at the pageant. Cote d'Ivoire competed at the pageant in only 1 year and never return again until now. Maria was appointed to compete at Miss International 1986 in Nagasaki, Japan. She failed at the pageant but she is the only one Ivorian who marked her country at two prestigious pageants in the World. Madaussou Kamara became the second representative at Miss International 1999 in Tokyo, Japan. She was the runner-up at Miss Cote d'Ivoire, in unknown reasons the reigning winner of Miss CI in that year, Sylviane Dodoo did not compete at all pageants.

See also
Miss France

References

External links
Miss CI Official site

Beauty pageants in Ivory Coast
Ivorian awards
Cote d'Ivoire
Recurring events established in 1956
1956 establishments in Ivory Coast
Cote d'Ivoire